Goesan County (Goesan-gun) is a county in North Chungcheong Province, South Korea.

Demographics
As of 2021, Goesan-gun has a population of about 40,000 people.  The area has been affected strongly by the graying of the South Korean population, and more than a third of residents are over the age of 65.  Schools have closed as urbanization and falling birthrates in Korea have resulted in a declining number of children to attend them.  One school, to prevent closure due to low enrollment, offers free housing to families with school-age children.

Tourist spot
 Sanmagi-yetgil
Sanmagi-yetgil is a  road that extends from Sao-rang-maeul village (Oe-sa-ri, Chilseong-myeon, Goesan-gun, Chungbuk) to Sanmagi village in the mountains. It is a stroll path restored to resemble the traditional mountain road with a picturesque landscape.

Twin towns – sister cities

Goesan is twinned with:

Domestic
 Gwanak-gu, Seoul
 Gangnam-gu, Seoul
 Guro-gu, Seoul
 Jung-gu, Incheon
 Anyang, Gyeonggi
 Ansan, Gyeonggi
 Uiwang, Gyeonggi

International
  Ji'an, Jilin, China

Climate
Goesan has a monsoon-influenced humid continental climate (Köppen: Dwa) with cold, dry winters and hot, rainy summers.

See also
 Geography of South Korea
 Chungcheong

References

External links

 Goesan County home page (in English)
 Goesan County home page (in Korean)

 
Counties of North Chungcheong Province